The 2019–20 UEFA Women's Champions League was the 19th edition of the European women's club football championship organised by UEFA, and the 11th edition since being rebranded as the UEFA Women's Champions League.

The competition was postponed indefinitely on 17 March 2020 due to the COVID-19 pandemic in Europe. The final, originally scheduled to be played on 24 May 2020 at the Generali Arena in Vienna, Austria, was officially postponed on 23 March 2020. On 17 June 2020, UEFA announced that the remaining matches, including the quarter-finals, semi-finals and final, would be played between 21 and 30 August at San Mamés, Bilbao and Anoeta Stadium, San Sebastián in Basque Country, Spain behind closed doors, as an eight-team single-match knockout tournament, with San Sebastián hosting the final.

Lyon were the defending champions, having won the previous four editions. They successfully defended their title after defeating VfL Wolfsburg 3–1 in the final for their fifth consecutive and seventh overall title. For the first time, the video assistant referee (VAR) system was used in the competition, where it was implemented in the final.

Association team allocation
The association ranking based on the UEFA women's country coefficients is used to determine the number of participating teams for each association:
Associations 1–12 each have two teams qualify.
All other associations, if they enter, each have one team qualify.
The winners of the 2018–19 UEFA Women's Champions League are given an additional entry if they do not qualify for the 2019–20 UEFA Women's Champions League through their domestic league.

An association must have an eleven-a-side women's domestic league to enter a team.

Association ranking
For the 2019–20 UEFA Women's Champions League, the associations are allocated places according to their 2018 UEFA women's country coefficients, which takes into account their performance in European competitions from 2013–14 to 2017–18.

Notes
TH – Additional berth for title holders
NR – No rank (association did not enter in any of the seasons used for computing coefficients)
DNE – Did not enter

Distribution
Unlike the men's Champions League, not every association enters a team, and so the exact number of teams entering in the qualifying round (played as mini-tournaments with four teams in each group) and knockout phase (starting from the round of 32, played as home-and-away two-legged ties except for the one-match final) cannot be determined until the full entry list is known. In general, the title holders, the champions of the top 12 associations, and the runners-up of highest-ranked associations (exact number depending on the number of entries) receive a bye to the round of 32. All other teams (runners-up of lowest-ranked associations and champions of associations starting from 13th) enter the qualifying round, with the group winners and a maximum of two best runners-up advancing to the round of 32.

The following is the access list for this season.

Teams
A record of 62 teams from 50 of the 55 UEFA member associations entered this season's competition. Armenia are sending their first team after the first edition in 2001–02.

Legend
TH: Title holders
CH: Domestic league champions
RU: Domestic league runners-up

Round and draw dates
The schedule of the competition is as follows (all draws are held at the UEFA headquarters in Nyon, Switzerland).

The competition was postponed indefinitely on 17 March 2020 due to the COVID-19 pandemic in Europe. The final, originally scheduled to be played on 24 May 2020 at the Viola Park, Vienna, was officially postponed on 23 March 2020. A working group was set up by UEFA to decide the calendar of the remainder of the season, with the final decision made at the UEFA Executive Committee meeting on 17 June 2020.

Qualifying round

The draw of the qualifying round was held at the UEFA headquarters in Nyon, Switzerland on 21 June 2019, 13:30 CEST. The 40 teams were allocated into four seeding positions based on their UEFA women's club coefficients at the beginning of the season. They were drawn into ten groups of four containing one team from each of the four seeding positions. First, the ten teams which were pre-selected as hosts were drawn from their own designated pot and allocated to their respective group as per their seeding positions. Next, the remaining 30 teams were drawn from their respective pot which are allocated according to their seeding positions.

In each group, teams played against each other in a round-robin mini-tournament at the pre-selected hosts. The ten group winners advanced to the round of 32 to join the 22 teams which received a bye. The matches were played on 7, 10 and 13 August 2019.

Group 1

Group 2

Group 3

Group 4

Group 5

Group 6

Group 7

Group 8

Group 9

Group 10

Knockout phase

Bracket

Round of 32

Round of 16

Quarter-finals

Semi-finals

Final

Statistics

Top goalscorers
There were 490 goals scored in 115 matches, with an average of  goals per match.

Goals scored in qualifying round counts toward the topscorer award.

Notes

Squad of the season
The following players were named in the squad of the season by the UEFA's technical observers:

Players of the season

For the first time, positional awards were awarded in the Women's Champions League for best goalkeeper, defender, midfielder and forward of the competition. Votes were cast for players of the season by coaches of the eight teams who participated in the final tournament in Spain, together with 20 journalists selected by the European Sports Media (ESM) group who specialize in women's football. The coaches were not allowed to vote for players from their own teams. Jury members selected their top three players, with the first receiving five points, the second three and the third one. The shortlist of the top three players was announced on 17 September 2020. The award winners were announced and presented during the 2020–21 UEFA Champions League group stage draw in Switzerland on 1 October 2020.

Goalkeeper of the season

Defender of the season

Midfielder of the season

Forward of the season

See also
2019 Copa Libertadores Femenina
2019 AFC Women's Club Championship
2019–20 UEFA Champions League

Notes

References

External links

UEFA Women's Champions League Matches: 2019–20, UEFA.com
Women's Domestic Leagues, UEFA.com

 
2019-20
Women's Champions League
2019 in women's association football
2020 in women's association football
Association football events postponed due to the COVID-19 pandemic